Glasgow Industrial School for Girls was formed in 1881 when the mixed industrial school was split into a new location in Maryhill, Glasgow.

It was a residential workhouse that provided education for girls from families that could not support them. It reached notoriety in 1882 when the assistant superintendent resigned following public outcry over a flogging she administered.

The girls were taught sewing, knitting, house work, helping in the kitchen and laundry, and machine work. They made uniforms for the boys in the associated industrial school. On moving to Maryhill there were two hundred girls.

References

Vocational education
Scottish poorhouses
Women educational personnel
Glasgow
Industrial schools